The 2013–14 VfB Stuttgart II season is the season for the reserve team for VfB Stuttgart. The season began on 20 July 2013 and will end on 10 May 2014. They are participating in the 3. Liga.

Review and events
The season began on 20 July 2013 with a loss against Borussia Dortmund II and will end on 10 May 2014 against Chemnitzer FC. They are participating in the 3. Liga.

Fixtures and results

Legend

3. Liga

League fixtures and results

References

VfB Stuttgart II seasons
German football clubs 2013–14 season